Ilex pubescens, the downy holly or pubescent holly, is a species of flowering plant in the family Aquifoliaceae, native to southern China, Hainan, and Taiwan. It is widely used in traditional Chinese medicine for a variety of aliments.

Subtaxa
The following varieties are accepted:
Ilex pubescens var. kwangsiensis  – mainland China
Ilex pubescens var. pubescens – entire range

References

pubescens
Flora of South-Central China
Flora of Southeast China
Flora of Hainan
Flora of Taiwan
Plants described in 1833